Cheiracanthium indicum, is a species of spider of the genus Cheiracanthium. It is native to India and Sri Lanka.

See also 
 List of Eutichuridae species

References

indicum
Invertebrates of Sri Lanka
Spiders of Asia
Spiders described in 1874